Sayed Dhiya Saeed Ebrahim Alawi Shubbar (born July 17, 1992 in Muharraq, Bahrain) is a Bahraini footballer who plays for Al-Riffa in Bahraini Premier League. He is also a member of the Bahrain national football team.

He normally plays as a defensive midfielder, but he can also play in defence.

International career

International goals
Scores and results list Bahrain's goal tally first.

References

External links 
 
 
 

Living people
Bahraini footballers
Bahraini expatriate footballers
Expatriate footballers in Kuwait
Bahrain international footballers
1992 births
2015 AFC Asian Cup players
2019 AFC Asian Cup players
Footballers at the 2010 Asian Games
People from Muharraq
Association football midfielders
Asian Games competitors for Bahrain
Al-Nasr SC (Kuwait) players
Kuwait Premier League players
Bahraini expatriate sportspeople in Kuwait
Riffa SC players
Bahraini Premier League players
Al-Muharraq SC players
FIFA Century Club